Karate at the 2017 Islamic Solidarity Games was held at Baku Sports Hall, Baku, Azerbaijan from 13 to 14 May 2017

Medal summary

Men

Women

Medal table

References 

List of medalists

External links
Official website

2017 Islamic Solidarity Games
Islamic Solidarity Games
2017
Karate in Azerbaijan